Engine number may refer to an identification number marked on the engine of a vehicle or, in the case of locomotives, to the road number of the locomotive. The engine number is separate from the Vehicle Identification Number (VIN).

Automobiles
Every vehicle engine is marked with an engine number by the factory.  The engine number includes coded information, which can be decoded to reveal, for example, year of manufacture, country of manufacture, and engine type.

Trains
The term is also used in train terminology.  In this instance, it refers to the road number assigned to motive power by the operator, as opposed to a constructor's or builder's number (equivalent to a vehicle VIN number).

See also
 Aircraft engine position number
 Builder's plate
 Number plate

References

Auto parts
Engine technology
Rolling stock